Robert Joseph Nodar Jr. (March 23, 1916 – September 11, 1974) was an American politician and a Republican member of the United States House of Representatives from New York.

Biography
Nodar was born in Brooklyn, New York, attended the public schools of New York City and graduated from Newtown High School, Elmhurst, New York, in 1935.

Career
Nodar was engaged as a clerk in the Manufacturers Trust Company, in New York City from 1935 to 1939; and with the Crucible Steel Corp. of America from 1940 to 1942.

During World War II, Nodar served in the United States Army Air Forces, with service in the South Pacific, from March 18, 1942, until discharged as a Master Sergeant on January 6, 1946.

Elected as a Republican to the Eightieth Congress in 1946, Nodar served from January 3, 1947 to January 3, 1949.  An unsuccessful candidate for reelection in 1948 to the Eighty-first Congress, he became a clerk with Solomon Brothers & Hutzell in New York City.

Death
Nodar died in Flushing, Queens, New York on September 11, 1974 (age 58 years, 172 days). He is interred at Pinelawn Memorial Park, near Farmingdale, Long Island, New York.

References

External links

1916 births
1974 deaths
People from Brooklyn
United States Army Air Forces soldiers
United States Army personnel of World War II
Republican Party members of the United States House of Representatives from New York (state)
20th-century American politicians